Scheduled Areas are areas in India with a preponderance of tribal population subject to a special governance mechanism wherein the central government plays a direct role in safeguarding cultural and economic interests of scheduled tribes in the area. The authority to create and administer Scheduled Areas stems from the Fifth and Sixth Schedules of the Constitution of India.

Fifth Schedule area 
The Fifth Schedule protects tribal interests in the states of Andhra Pradesh, Telangana, Gujarat, Jharkhand, Chhattisgarh, Himachal Pradesh, Madhya Pradesh, Maharashtra, Odisha, and Rajasthan.
In the Fifth Schedule areas, the governor of the state has special responsibilities with respect to tribal populations in the areas including issuing directives to the state government and limiting the effect of acts of the central or state legislature on the areas.

Sixth Schedule area 
The Sixth Schedule protects tribal interests in Assam, Meghalaya, Tripura and Mizoram.
In the Sixth Schedule areas, the emphasis is on self-rule; tribal communities are granted considerable autonomy, including powers to make laws and receive central government funds for social and infrastructure development. To enable local control, the role of the Governor and the State are subject to significant limitations in the areas.

See also
 Panchayats (Extension to Scheduled Areas) Act 1996
 Scheduled Castes and Scheduled Tribes

References

External links
 Cabinet approves declaration of Scheduled Areas in respect of Rajasthan under Fifth Schedule to the Constitution of India

Constitution of India